Raynsford is a surname. Notable people include:

Helene Raynsford (born 1979), British rower
James Raynsford (1891–1956), American footballer
John Raynsford (1482–1559), English politician
Richard Raynsford (1605–1680), English judge
Nick Raynsford (born 1945), British politician

See also
Rainsford